X Factor is a Norwegian  television music talent show contested by aspiring pop singers drawn from public auditions. It is broadcast on Friday evenings on the TV 2 Network in Norway.

Judges' categories and their contestants

In each season, each judge is allocated a category to mentor and chooses three acts to progress to the live shows. This table shows, for each season, which category each judge was allocated and which acts he or she put through to the live shows.

Key:
 – Winning judge/category. Winners are in bold, eliminated contestants in small font.

Season 1 (2009)
The first season of the show was aired from September through to December 2009. The contestants were divided into three categories. Groups were mentored by Mira Craig, Over 25s by Jan Fredrik Karlsen and the 16-24s by Peter Peters.

Contestants 
The top 12 acts were confirmed as follows:

Key:
 – Winner
 – Runner-up
 – Third Place

Results summary

Colour key:

Live show details

Week 1 (9 October 2009)

Judges' votes to eliminate
 Peters: Reaching Horizons
 Craig: Lise Mæland
 Karlsen: Reaching Horizons

Week 2 (16 October 2009)

Judges' votes to eliminate
 Karlsen: Gabrielle Leithaug
 Peters: Stine Terese Tinker Julseth
 Craig: Stine Terese Tinker Julseth

Week 3 (23 October 2009)

Judges' votes to eliminate
 Karlsen: No Name - No Fame
 Peters: No Name - No Fame
 Craig: No Name - No Fame

Week 4 (30 October 2009)

Judges' votes to eliminate
 Karlsen: Lise Mæland
 Craig: Rikke Lie
 Peters: Rikke Lie

Week 5 (6 November 2009)

Judges' votes to eliminate
 Karlsen: The Johnsen Sisters
 Peters: The Johnsen Sisters
 Craig: The Johnsen Sisters

Week 6 (13 November 2009)

Judges' votes to eliminate
 Karlsen: Gabrielle Leithaug
 Peters: Mari Lorentzen
 Craig: Gabrielle Leithaug

Week 7 (20 November 2009)
Theme: Songs from films

Judges' votes to eliminate
 Peters: Shackles
 Craig: Pernille Svensen Øiestad
 Karlsen: Pernille Svensen Øiestad

Season 2 (2010)
The second and final season of the show was aired from September to December 2010. Auditions were held in Tromsø (28–29 April 2010), Trondheim (7–9 May), Bergen (26–28 May), Kristiansand (5–6 June) and Oslo (17–20 June 2010).

Replacing Charlotte Thorstvedt as new program presenters were Ravi and Guri Solberg after Thorstvedt received much criticism for her efforts in the first season. The judges were Elisabeth Andreassen, Klaus Sonstad, Jan Fredrik Karlsen and Marion Ravn.

The format had changed with 4 categories instead of three (with Under 25s now divided between Boys Under 25 and Girls Under 25). Each category had three finalists instead of the earlier four.

24 reached judges houses. Andreassen was helped by Alexander Rybak, Sonstad by Mariann Thomassen, Karlsen by Chand Torsvik and Ravn by Sveinung Sundli. Singer Benn was a guest judge.

The 12 eliminated acts were:
Boys: Adrian Jørgensen, Bjørn Henrik Brandtenborg, Jonas Nybakk Benyoub
Girls: Ingrid Galadriel Aune Brosveet, Ingrid Haukland, Madeleine Christensen
Over 25s: Marianne Solberg Follestad, Jan Hedelund, Dilsa Calimli
Groups: Nemesis, Skatebirds, Mama's Garden

Contestants 
The top 12 acts were confirmed as follows:

Key:
 – Winner
 – Runner-up
 – Third Place

Results summary

Colour key:

Live show details

Week 1 (8 October 2010)

Judges' votes to eliminate
 Andreassen: 2 Elements
 Sonstad: Hans Bollandsås
 Ravn: 2 Elements
 Karlsen: Hans Bollandsås

Week 2 (15 October 2010)
Theme: Love songs

Judges' votes to eliminate
 Karlsen: Irresistible
 Ravn: Tanita Kolås
 Sonstad: Tanita Kolås
 Andreassen: Irresistible

Week 3 (22 October 2010)
Theme: Songs from childhood

Judges' votes to eliminate
 Karlsen: Sofie Bratseth
 Andreassen: Sofie Bratseth
 Ravn: Sofie Bratseth
 Sonstad: Sofie Bratseth

Week 4 (29 October 2010)
Theme: Unplugged songs

Judges' votes to eliminate
 Karlsen: Irresistible
 Ravn: Irresistible
 Sonstad: Annsofi Pettersen
 Andreassen: Irresistible

Week 5 (5 November 2010)
Theme: Songs from films

Judges' votes to eliminate
 Andreassen: Eivind Nyberg Sagli
 Sonstad: Ole Gustav Johnsen
 Ravn: Ole Gustav Johnsen
 Karlsen: Ole Gustav Johnsen

Week 6 (12 November 2010)
Theme: Songs about friendship

Judges' votes to eliminate
 Karlsen: Marthe Valle
 Andreassen: Annsofi Pettersen
 Ravn: Marthe Valle
 Sonstad: Annsofi Pettersen

Week 7 (19 November 2010)
Theme: Songs by Norwegian artists

Week 8 (26 November 2010)
Theme: Role models

References

External links
Official website 

Norwegian reality television series
Norwegian music television series
2009 Norwegian television series debuts
Norway
TV 2 (Norway) original programming
Television series by Fremantle (company)
2010 Norwegian television series endings
2000s Norwegian television series
2010s Norwegian television series
Norwegian television series based on British television series